Three Mile Island is an Apple II game written by Richard Orban and published by Muse Software in 1979. Three Mile Island: Special Edition is a 1980 update that's written in 6502 assembly language instead of Integer BASIC.

Contents
Three Mile Island is a simulation game set in a nuclear power plant with an impending nuclear meltdown.

Reception
Bruce F. Webster reviewed Three Mile Island in The Space Gamer No. 34. Webster commented that "Three Mile Island is not a cheap piece of software, in any sense of the term. But for those of you with the interest and the money, I can recommend it to you without reservations."

See also
 Scram, a 1981 Atari 8-bit family game with a similar premise

References

External links
Review in Creative Computing

1979 video games
Apple II games
Apple II-only games
Muse Software games
Simulation video games
Video games about nuclear technology
Video games developed in the United States